Human rights in Iraq are addressed in the following articles:
Human rights in pre-Saddam Iraq
Human rights in Saddam Hussein's Iraq
Human rights in post-invasion Iraq
Human rights in Iraqi Kurdistan
Human rights in ISIL-controlled territory
Human rights in Islamic countries